Mint'ang station is a railway station in Sinsang-ri, Kimjŏngsuk-kun, Ryanggang Province, North Korea, on the Pukbunaeryuk Line of the Korean State Railway.

History

The station was opened on 27 November 1987 by the Korean State Railway, along with the rest of the first eastern section of the Pukbunaeryuk Line between Huju and Hyesan. The station name comes from the name of a village, Mintang-ri, which existed from the Chosŏn Dynasty period until 1952, when it was merged into Sinsang-ri.

Gallery

References

External links

Railway stations in North Korea